The sigmoid arteries are 2-5 branches of the inferior mesenteric artery that are distributed to the distal descending colon and the sigmoid colon.

Anatomy

Course and relations 
The sigmoid arteries course obliquely inferior-ward and to the left, passing posterior to the peritoneum and in anterior to the psoas major, ureter, and gonadal vessels.

Anastomoses 
The sigmoid arteries anastomose with the left colic superiorly, and with the superior rectal artery inferiorly.

References

External links
  - "Intestines and Pancreas: Branches of the Inferior Mesenteric Artery"
 

Arteries of the abdomen